The Omaha, Abilene and Wichita Railway was organized on July 7, 1885, as an extension of the Chicago, Rock Island and Pacific Railway. It went from St. Joseph, Missouri through Topeka, Kansas to Wichita, then connecting to Beatrice, Nebraska. The franchises of the company were sold to the Chicago, Kansas and Nebraska Railroad, a newly created Rock Island subsidiary, in 1886.

See also
 History of Omaha

References

Defunct Kansas railroads
History of Omaha, Nebraska
Predecessors of the Chicago, Rock Island and Pacific Railroad
Railway companies established in 1885
Railway companies disestablished in 1886